Antonio "Paulito" Trigo (born 22 November 1976 in Nampula) is a Mozambican football (soccer) player who last played for Mamelodi Sundowns. His position is a midfielder.

Clubs
1994-1998 :  Ferroviário de Maputo
1998-2003 :  Manning Rangers
2003-2007 :  Mamelodi Sundowns

External links
 

1976 births
Living people
People from Nampula Province
Mozambican footballers
Mozambican expatriate footballers
Mozambique international footballers
1998 African Cup of Nations players
Mamelodi Sundowns F.C. players
Manning Rangers F.C. players
Clube Ferroviário de Maputo footballers
Expatriate soccer players in South Africa
Mozambican expatriate sportspeople in South Africa
Association football midfielders